Deer Chase is a historic plantation house located near Saluda, Middlesex County, Virginia.  It was constructed about 1750, and is a -story, three-bay, brick dwelling with a clipped gable roof.  The interior has a central hall plan.  Also on the property is a contributing three-bay frame school house.

It was listed on the National Register of Historic Places in 1973.

References

Plantation houses in Virginia
Houses on the National Register of Historic Places in Virginia
Houses completed in 1750
Houses in Middlesex County, Virginia
National Register of Historic Places in Middlesex County, Virginia